The Cathedral of Christ's Nativity is the main cathedral of the Moldovan Orthodox Church in Sectorul Centru, Moldova. It was commissioned by the governor of New Russia, Prince Mikhail Semyonovich Vorontsov, and Metropolitan Gavril Bănulescu-Bodoni in 1830. 

The cathedral was built in the 1830s to a Neoclassical design by Abram Melnikov (who had designed a similar church in Bolhrad). The cathedral was bombed during World War II, and its bell tower was destroyed by the local Communists in 1962. The new bell tower was constructed in 1997. During the Soviet period, worship was prohibited and the cathedral was transformed into an exhibition center.

Melnikov's design is Neoclassical. The façade is very simple and clear with six Doric column for the entrance. Because of the numerous destructions which the cathedral suffered throughout time, the building has received several restorations and shifts in its shape. For instance, the current zinc dome and its cross at the top are both an addition from 1997 built over the previous structure. The inside was completely blank during the Soviet period but nowadays it has painted walls in pure Orthodox style.

See also 
Transfiguration Cathedral, Odessa
Moldovan Orthodox Church

References 
 Centrul istoric al Chişinǎlui, La începutul secolului al XXI-LEA, Chișinǎu, Editura ARC, 2009.

External links 
 
Despre catedrală pe situl Mitropoliei Moldovei
Ansamblul Catedrala Naşterea Domnului

Religious buildings and structures in Moldova
Cathedrals in Moldova
Churches completed in 1836
19th-century Eastern Orthodox church buildings
History of Chișinău
Buildings and structures in Chișinău
Neoclassical church buildings in Moldova